Kathryn Robinson (born April 8, 1985) is a Canadian equestrian who competes in the sport of eventing. Robinson won a bronze medal as part of the Canadian eventing team at the 2015 Pan American Games in Toronto.

In July 2016, she was named to Canada's Olympic team, as a replacement for Selena O'Hanlon. At the Games held in Rio de Janeiro, Brazil, Robinson placed 10th in the team competition and was eliminated from the individual event during the cross-country stage after incurring three refusals.

References

1985 births
Living people
Canadian female equestrians
Canadian sportswomen
Equestrians at the 2015 Pan American Games
Pan American Games silver medalists for Canada
Sportspeople from Kettering
Equestrians at the 2016 Summer Olympics
Olympic equestrians of Canada
Pan American Games medalists in equestrian
Medalists at the 2015 Pan American Games
21st-century Canadian women
20th-century Canadian women